Nvidia's High-Definition Digital Processing (HDVP) is an HDTV accelerator on the Geforce 2 GTS. It has a downscalar that supports 1080i and 720p to SDTV resolution. In combination with a tuner chip it creates an accelerated HDTV viewing system that supports time-shifted recording. The Geforce 2 GTS also includes second generation motion compensation, improved from the motion compensation on the Geforce 256. It does not seem to include IDCT acceleration. The HDVP also includes de-interlace acceleration including bob, weave, temporal filter, and advanced de-interlacing. Finally, HDVP supports subpicture compositing, and color enhancements including brightness, hue, contrast, and saturation. nVidia's HDVP would endure through the GeForce 4 Series in the Geforce 4 Ti NV25.

See also 
 GeForce 256's Motion Compensation
 Video Processing Engine
 PureVideo
 DirectX Video Acceleration (DxVA) API for Microsoft Windows operating-system.
 VDPAU (Video Decode and Presentation API for Unix) from Nvidia
 X-Video Motion Compensation (XvMC) API for Linux/UNIX operating-system.

References

External links
 http://www.digital-digest.com/dvd/software/players/powerdvd/pdvd255_new.txt
 http://www.orpheuscomputing.com/downloads2/GeForce_HDVP_brief.pdf
 http://www.angelfire.com/ultra/slambammin/Video_Card_Investigations.pdf
 ftp://ftp.uni-duisburg.de/Hardware/Nvidia/.../geforce2_mx_overvw.pdf
 http://www.tomshardware.com/reviews/full-review-nvidia,204.html
 http://www.necdriver.com/nec-driver/NVIDIA-GeForce2-Go-Video-Driver-For-Versa-P440_478.html
 http://phx.corporate-ir.net/phoenix.zhtml?c=116466&p=irol-newsArticle_print&ID=89139&highlight=
 http://cnnfn.cnn.com/2000/04/25/technology/nvidia/

Nvidia products
Video acceleration